Boris Zinoviyevich Falikov, born September 24, 1947, in Holmsk, Sakhalin region, Russian Federation - is a Soviet and Russian historian and publicist, specializing in the field of new religions, has a Ph.D. in history sciences, assistant professor at “Centre of Religion Studies" with Russian State University for the Humanities.
He is the younger brother of the poet and writer .

Biography
Falikov was born on 24 September 1947 in town Holmsk of the Sakhalin region. The Falikovs came to Sakhalin island from Vladivostok: the head of the family was sent to be the assistant director in the Sakhalin science and research institute of fish industry and oceanography, where the director used to be Japanese. Soon enough, Falikov's father became the institute's new director, but already in 1949 the Falikovs left the island for mainland.

Boris has graduated from the faculty of foreign languages of Saratov Pedagogical Institute ... Then he joined the teaching staff of the Institute of USA and Canada with the Russian Academy of Sciences. There, in 1985 under the supervision of Furman D. E., he defended a historical sciences PhD candidate's thesis about “Socio-political aspects of some religious movements in the US (hinduism and buddhism)” (the national standard  for which is 07.00.03 — «Generic history»). He has worked in the Orientalist Institute with the Russian Academy of Sciences, in the department of comparative cultural studies, where he's been studying the phenomenon of spreading of hinduism and buddhism in the Western culture.
During early 1990s he's been reading lectures in the Lewis & Clark College, University of Georgetown and the University of Kansas.

In 1997–1998 he was the OSCE expert on issues of freedom of religion.
Since 1999 - he is assistant professor at Russian State University for the Humanities (RSUH). He is teaching at the RSUH "Centre of Religion Studies” (a course in “Modern non-traditional religional doctrines and cults”) and is head of the international department in the Kultura newspaper. Boris Falikov is an author to 4 monographs: “Religion as part of political life in the US” (1985), “Neo-hinduism and the Western culture” (1994), “Christianity and other religions” (1999), “Cults and culture: from Helena Blavatsky to Ron Hubbard” (2007).

In 2000–2002 was the chief editor of the internet portal “World of religions”. His publicist works on problems of religions and culture were printed in the magazines - Kontinent, Znamya, Novy Mir, The New Times, "", “”, “”, “”, newspapers: "", Nezavisimaya Gazeta, Izvestia, Vremya Novostei, “Kultura”, Moskovskiye Novosti, internet newspapers and publications Gazeta.Ru, “World of religions”, Russian Journal.

Bibliography
Books:
 
 
 
 

Publications:
 
 
  
 
  (participated in the round table)
  
  
 
 
 
 
 
 
 

Publicist works

References

Further reading and external links 
 
 All Falikov's publications on Stengazeta.net (in Russian)
 All publications in Gazeta.ru (in Russian)

Critics 
 Bitten, Natasha  The orthodox orientalist Borist Falikov believes, that emansipation of women causes terrorism // Demagogy.ru (in Russian)
  Boris Falikov "Cults and cultures: from Helena Blavatsky to Ron Hubbard" (book review) // Portal-Credo.Ru (in Russian)
  "Cults and Culture". The ironical approach. Boris Falikov "Cults and cultures: from Helena Blavatsky to Ron Hubbard" (book review) //, 02.07.2008 (in Russian).
 Alexander Dvorkin Melitopol — London or travel notes by Boris Falikov // , 2000 (in Russian).
 Alexander Dvorkin, Mikhailov Anatoly Controversy with Boris Falikov.
 Alexander Dvorkin Congrats, you lie again.. // , 2011 (in Russian).
 Alexander Dvorkin Boris Falikov Anatomy of a Myth (book review).

Academic staff of the Russian State University for the Humanities
21st-century Russian historians
Historians of Russia
1947 births
Living people